David E. Schenkman (born September 27, 1939) is an American numismatist and author.

Early life
Schenkman was born in New York City and served in the United States Navy.

Career
Schenkman began collecting coins in 1949, and began his interest in tokens and medals in 1960. From 1975 to 1980 he was editor of the Copperhead Courier, edited "A Survey of American Trade Tokens" in 1975. He authored “World of Exonumia” in Coin World between 1985 and 1988 and “Token Topics” to Numismatic News. He currently writes the "Tokens and Medals" column for The Numismatist. Schenkman has received many awards, including Heath Literary Awards in 1994 and 2013. Over his career he has written eight books.

In 2013, he received the Farran Zerbe Memorial Award from the American Numismatic Association.

Schenkman served as President of both the Token and Medal Society and the Civil War Token Society, and has spent over 18 years as an instructor at the American Numismatic Association's Summer Seminar.

References

American numismatists
1939 births
Living people
Writers from New York City